The 1884 Wisconsin gubernatorial election was held on November 4, 1884.

Republican nominee Jeremiah McLain Rusk defeated Democratic nominee Nicholas D. Fratt and two other nominees with 51.00% of the vote.

This was the first Wisconsin gubernatorial election held in an even-numbered year. In 1882, a constitutional amendment was carried moving gubernatorial elections from odd-numbered to even-numbered years.

General election

Candidates
Major party candidates
Nicholas D. Fratt, Democratic, President of the Racine County Bank, Democratic nominee for Governor of Wisconsin in 1881
Jeremiah McLain Rusk, Republican, incumbent Governor

Other candidates
Samuel D. Hastings, Prohibition, former State Treasurer, Prohibition nominee for Wisconsin's 3rd congressional district in 1882
William L. Utley, Greenback, former State Senator

Results

References

Bibliography
 
 
 

1884
Wisconsin
Gubernatorial